Stephen George Oliver  (born 3 November 1949) is an Emeritus Professor in the Department of Biochemistry at the University of Cambridge, and a Fellow of Wolfson College, Cambridge.

Education
Oliver was educated at the University of Bristol gaining a Bachelor of Science degree in Microbiology in 1971 followed by a PhD from the National Institute for Medical Research (NIMR) in 1974.

Research
Oliver's areas of research include functional genomics, systems biology and drug discovery using the model organism Saccharomyces cerevisiae which he has worked on since the 1970s. In 1992, whilst working at UMIST, Oliver led the team which provided first complete sequence analysis of an entire chromosome from any organism. More recently he has also been involved in the creation of a Robot Scientist and has been awarded research funding as principal investigator or co-investigator with a total value of over £26 million by the Biotechnology and Biological Sciences Research Council ((BBSRC).

References

Living people
Alumni of the University of Bristol
Academics of the University of Manchester Institute of Science and Technology
Alumni of the University of Manchester
Members of the European Molecular Biology Organization
Fellows of the American Association for the Advancement of Science
Fellows of Wolfson College, Cambridge
1949 births